Saw Lat was a queen consort of kings Naratheinkha and Sithu II of the Pagan Dynasty of Myanmar (Burma).

Royal chronicles do not agree on her ancestry. Maha Yazawin (1724) says she was the younger of the two daughters of Yazathu and Eindawthe, niece of queens Taung Pyinthe and Khin U. But Yazawin Thit (1798) says she was a younger sister of Queen Min Aung Myat. Hmannan Yazawin (1832) sides with Maha Yazawin's account.

The queen had a daughter with Naratheinkha but their child died in early 1170s during the reign of Naratheinkha. She died during the reign of Sithu II (after the death of Queen Weluwaddy in 1186), and was succeeded by another queen as the Queen of the Northern Palace.

References

Bibliography
 
 
 

Chief queens consort of Pagan
Queens consort of Pagan
12th-century Burmese women